Big Bowman Pond is a small glacial lake in the Taborton section of the Town of Sand Lake, Rensselaer County, New York, United States.  The lake is located on a geologic formation known as the Rensselaer Plateau.

Big Bowman 
Big Bowman Pond is known to locals as the home of Big Bowman (also known as "Bowie"), a large, aquatic cryptid. Though its description varies from one account to the next, Big Bowman is generally described as being similar in appearance to the Bunyip, a mythical creature from Australian Aboriginal mythology. Rumors of the existence of Big Bowman began to circulate the greater Albany area in the late 1800s after a young boy went missing while swimming in the lake.

References 

Lakes of Rensselaer County, New York
Lakes of New York (state)